Rohal is a khum (commune) of Preah Netr Preah District in Banteay Meanchey Province in north-western Cambodia.

Villages

 Rohal
 Sala Chheh
 Chak
 Tep Kaosa
 Snay
 Anlong Thmei
 Popel
 Paoy Svay
 Roessei
 Prey Moan
 Stoeng Kambot

References

Communes of Banteay Meanchey province
Preah Netr Preah District